Paris Frills is a 1945 French drama film directed by Jacques Becker and starring Raymond Rouleau, Micheline Presle and Jean Chevrier. It was made in 1944 during the German occupation but not released until the following year. The film's sets were designed by the art director Max Douy. It was shot at the Francoeur Studios in Paris. Exteriors were shot in the 16th arrondissement of Paris.

Plot
Micheline (Micheline Presle),  a young woman from the provinces, arrives in Paris to prepare for her marriage to a silk manufacturer from Lyon, Daniel Rousseau (Jean Chevrier). But she falls in love with the best friend of her husband-to-be, the fashion designer Philippe Clarence (Raymond Rouleau). He is an impenitent Don Juan who seduces her when he feels the need for some creative inspiration and then drops her just as quickly  when he comes to devote himself to a new collection. Micheline no longer feels she can go ahead and get married. A few weeks later Clarence tries to reconquer her but it is too late. She refuses. Clarence goes mad and throws himself from a window.

Main cast
 Raymond Rouleau as Philippe Clarence  
 Micheline Presle as Micheline Lafaurie  
 Jean Chevrier as Daniel Rousseau  
 Gabrielle Dorziat as Solange  
 Jeanne Fusier-Gir as Paulette  
 Françoise Lugagne as Anne-Marie 
 Christiane Barry as Lucienne  
 Rosine Luguet as Cousin  
 Yolande Bloin 
 Eveline Volney as Employee  
 Maria Carld 
 François Joux as Murier  
 Georges Roullet 
 Marc Doelnitz as Cousin

Influence
Jean-Paul Gaultier told the New Yorker that seeing Falbalas made him want to go into fashion. The story, about a Parisian dressmaker who seduces his best friend's fiancée, provided a detailed look at the fashion industry of the time, and shaped Gaultier's ideas of what that world would be like.

References

External links
 

1945 drama films
1945 films
Films directed by Jacques Becker
French drama films
Films set in Paris
1940s French-language films
Films about fashion designers
French black-and-white films
Films shot at Francoeur Studios
1940s French films